The 2006 Brabantse Pijl was the 46th edition of the Brabantse Pijl cycle race and was held on 26 March 2006. The race started in Zaventem and finished in Alsemberg. The race was won by Óscar Freire.

General classification

References

2006
Brabantse Pijl